John Michaluk (born c. 1942) is a former a Canadian football player who played for the Hamilton Tiger-Cats. He won the Grey Cup with Hamilton in 1967. He previously played college football at Kent State University.

References

1940s births
Living people
American football centers
Canadian football offensive linemen
Hamilton Tiger-Cats players
Hamilton Tiger-Cats team presidents
Kent State Golden Flashes football players